Mikaela Jenkins (born March 11, 2003) is an American Paralympic swimmer who represented the United States at the 2020 Summer Paralympics.

Career
Jenkins made her international debut for the United States at the 2019 World Para Swimming Championships where she won a gold medal in the women's 100 metre butterfly S10 event, and silver medals in the women's  freestyle relay 34pts and women's  freestyle relay 34pts events.

Jenkins represented the United States in the women's 100 metre butterfly S10 event at the 2020 Summer Paralympics and won a gold medal. She also competed in the women's 4×100 metre medley relay 34pts and won a gold medal.

On April 14, 2022, Jenkins was named to the roster to represent the United States at the 2022 World Para Swimming Championships.

Personal life
Jenkins was born with proximal femoral focal deficiency and underwent a left Syme's amputation when she was eight months old.

References

External links
 
 
 

2003 births
Living people
American amputees
American disabled sportspeople
American female butterfly swimmers
Sportspeople with limb difference
Sportspeople from Tampa, Florida
Swimmers from Florida
Medalists at the World Para Swimming Championships
Paralympic swimmers of the United States
Swimmers at the 2020 Summer Paralympics
Medalists at the 2020 Summer Paralympics
Paralympic medalists in swimming
Paralympic gold medalists for the United States
21st-century American women
American female freestyle swimmers
S10-classified Paralympic swimmers